The 2000-01 Brown Bears women's ice hockey team represented Brown University.

Regular season
Freshman Kim Fleet only appeared in 13 games.
Courtney Johnson appeared in 29 games and registered three game-winning goals. All 11 of her goals came in ECAC games. Johnson would rank third on the Bears in points accumulated in ECAC contests.
Kristy Zamora was the top returning goal scorer for the Bears from the previous campaign. Zamora appeared in all 29 games for the team.

Player stats

Skaters

Goaltenders

Awards and honors
 Courtney Johnson, Sakuma Award winner
 Christina Sorbara, 2001 Sarah Devens Award

References

External links
Official site

Brown Bears women's ice hockey seasons
Brown
Brown
Brown